The Real World: Back to New York is the tenth season of MTV's reality television series The Real World, which focuses on a group of diverse strangers living together for several months in a different city each season, as cameras follow their lives and interpersonal relationships. It is the second season of The Real World to be filmed in the Mid-Atlantic States region of the United States, specifically in New York after The Real World: New York.

The season featured seven people who lived in a four-floor loft at 632 Hudson Street in the Greenwich Village neighborhood of New York City. As its title indicates, Back to New York is the first season to take place in a city that had hosted a previous season, as the show's first season was set in New York in 1992.

The Back to New York season was filmed January 9 to June 2, 2001. It premiered July 3 of that year and consisted of 22 episodes.

The cast appeared in a cover feature in the Fall 2001 issue of Time Out New York.

The residence

The building was built in 1847, and for forty years following World War II, housed a Spanish-style sausage factory called the Esteve Packing Corporation. The building was purchased in the early 1990s for $450,000. The  third and fourth floors, which included the penthouse level and roof deck, were renovated for the series. The production equipment included 15 video cameras, 29 monitors, 142 studio lights, dozens of microphones, and a mile of cable. After completion of the season, the building was placed on the rental market for special events and short-term stays.

Assignment
Participation in the assignment was mandatory for the cast, and a roommate who was terminated from the assignment would be evicted from the residence and from the cast. The Back to New York housemates were assigned jobs as receptionists for Arista Records during the day, and helped gain publicity for their up-and-coming bands at night.

Cast
This season of Real World along with Road Rules: The Quest was the first and only season to be preceded by a casting special in which 27 potential cast members spent time together for a week to see how they interacted. Among the goings-on during the special was conflict between Coral and Ellen (who would eventually be cast on The Quest).

{|class="wikitable sortable" style="text-align:center;"
! scope="col" | Cast member
! scope="col" | Age
! scope="col" | Hometown
|-
! scope="row" | Coral Smith
| 21
| San Francisco, California
|- class="expand-child"
| colspan="3" align="left" | Coral is a 21-year-old part-time student and nanny living in San Francisco when she decided on a whim to audition for The Real World and Road Rules. Growing up, she experienced both privilege and poverty, living with her mother in government subsidized housing, and receiving an elite education through her father's savings. In the season premiere, she and Malik are offended at observations that Mike relates from his uncle about African-Americans, and attempts to educate him by teaching him about people like Malcolm X. 
|-
! scope="row" | Kevin Dunn
| 22
| Austin, Texas
|- class="expand-child"
| colspan="3" align="left" | Kevin, who is described by MTV as popular, intelligent, athletic, and charming, was diagnosed with testicular cancer in his senior year in high school, and forced to reexamine things that others his age took for granted. His treatment and recovery endowed him with a "sharp sense of humor," as well as a deeper spirituality and sensitivity to others.
|-
! scope="row" | Nicole Mitsch
| 22
| Atlanta, Georgia
|- class="expand-child"
| colspan="3" align="left" | Nicole is a graduating senior with a 4.0 grade point average at Morris Brown College. Her experiences include watching her mother suffer through a long, abusive relationship, and living in a government subsidized apartment, on which she pays $22 a month in rent. She is half African-American, half Caucasian, but is particularly proud of her African roots, and only dates black men.
|-
! scope="row" | Rachel Braband
| 18
| outside Chicago
|- class="expand-child"
| colspan="3" align="left" | Rachel is an only child, raised by a single mom outside Chicago. MTV describes her as "wide-eyed, bubbly and ready for life". She is a pop-punk fanatic who loves concerts and buying CDs. She is still inexperienced in many ways, and looking to explore opportunities and new experiences while on the show, but sometimes experiences ridicule at the hands of Coral and Nicole.
|-
! scope="row" | Mike Mizanin
| 20
| Parma, Ohio 
|- class="expand-child"
| colspan="3" align="left" | Mike grew up as an only child with divorced parents in a predominantly white middle-class neighborhood in the suburbs of Cleveland. He found a sense of family within his college fraternity. He is sheltered due to growing up in a conservative part of the country and has never actively interacted with gays and African Americans. He dropped out of college in order to join the cast. While growing up, he says that his father was a racist. MTV describes him as a "fireball of energy" and a "chick magnet [who] is still naive about relationships, and has a deep need to be loved." Early in the season, he finds himself embroiled in debates with castmates Nicole and Coral over race. He exhibits a wrestler alter ego named "The Miz". 
|-
! scope="row" | Lori Trespicio
| 21
| Roseland, New Jersey
|- class="expand-child"
| colspan="3" align="left" | Lori, the winner of a MTV.com Online Casting contest that earned her a spot in the finalists' casting special pool, is half-Filipino, half-Irish, and the youngest of three daughters. An overachiever who excels at everything, her sisters labeled her early on as a "super star" child, though her passion is singing, and MTV describes her voice as "gorgeous". She was one of the lead vocalists in a Boston College singing group called the Bostonians. She is also a self-described "drama magnet" who gets bored unless she has some type of conflict in life. Lori developed feelings for Kevin, but he did not reciprocate the feelings beyond friendship. She was ranked #72 in ''Stuff Magazines 2002 "102 Sexiest Women In The World".
|-
! scope="row" | Malik Cooper
| 23
| Berkeley, California
|- class="expand-child"
| colspan="3" align="left" | Malik is the son of a white mother and black father. He is the first child in his family, and the only one of his friends, to attend college. He intends to graduate from the University of California at Berkeley, and is also a popular Bay Area club/party DJ. In one episode, Coral and Nicole are critical of Malik, who wears a Marcus Garvey t-shirt, but dates white women, which they see as a contradiction, since Garvey was against race mixing.
|-
|}
: Age at the time of filming.

Episodes

After filming
At the 2008 The Real World Awards Bash, Coral won the "Roommate You Love to Hate" award."The Real World Awards Bash: Winners" . MTV.com. 2008. Retrieved January 17, 2008.

After filming, Mike Mizanin parlayed his "Miz" persona into a career as a professional wrestler for WWE, where he has held several championship titles, including the WWE Intercontinental Championship, the World Tag Team Championship, the WWE Tag Team Championship, the WWE United States Championship, Unified Tag Team Championship, and the WWE Championship. He also main-evented WrestleMania XXVII defeating John Cena in 2011. Mizanin and Trishelle Cannatella of The Real World: Las Vegas appeared on Fear Factor, where they won first place. He currently stars on Miz & Mrs. alongside his wife, Maryse Ouellet. The couple welcomed two daughters: Monroe Sky Mizanin (born on March 27, 2018) and Madison Jade Mizanin (born on September 20, 2019). In 2021, The Miz competed on the 30th season of Dancing with the Stars.

Coral Smith gave birth to her daughter, Charlie Beatrice, in June 2013.

The Challenge

Challenge in bold''' indicates the contestant was a finalist on the Challenge.

References

External links
The Real World: Back to New York at mtv.com
Cast bio page at mtv.com
Lori Trespicio's Official Website
Lori Trespicio's Myspace

Back to New York
Television shows set in New York City
2001 American television seasons
2001 in New York City
Television shows filmed in New York City